Valiasr Square is one of the main squares in Shiraz, Fars, Iran. Valiasr Square is the terminus of Salman Farsi (Pirnia) Boulevard, Zand Boulevard and Modares Boulevard. There is an urban bus terminal and a subway station which is under construction in this square.

Transportation

Streets
 Modares Boulevard
 Salman Farsi (Pirnia) Boulevard
 Zand Boulevard

Buses
 Route 10
 Route 17
 Route 20
 Route 51
 Route 70
 Route 71
 Route 72
 Route 76
 Route 77
 Route 79
 Route 97
 Route 98

Metro
 Valiasr Metro Station

Streets in Shiraz